Zakoros is a word which pertains to individuals of the culture of ancient Greece.

According to one source the word was used in two senses. In the first sense, and depending in some part on a translation of the word, the zakoros are understood to be people who participated in activities within temples, to sweep and clean the temples and also to tend the sacrificial fire. In the second sense is the example of the courtesan of the goddess Aphrodite, named Phryne, who was referred to as a zakoros because of the splendour of her body.

In another source, Phryne is mentioned again, and this shows the word to be a person who is a cult official, particularly from the 4th century BC and later, to refer especially to those  involved with foreign cults.

Demetrios of Sphettos, who was involved in the buildings catalogued IG II2 3187 and IG II2 3188, and an otherwise unnamed son of Antiochus of Sphettos, are referred to as zakoros.

References

Ancient Greek religion